Dioptrics is the branch of optics dealing with refraction, similarly the branch dealing with mirrors is known as catoptrics. Dioptrics is the study of the refraction of light, especially by lenses. Telescopes that create their image with an objective that is a convex lens (refractors) are said to be "dioptric" telescopes. 

An early study of dioptrics was conducted by Ptolemy in relationship to the human eye as well as refraction in media such as water.  The understanding of the principles of dioptrics was further expanded by Alhazen, considered the father of modern optics.

See also
 Diopter/Dioptre (unit of measurement)
 Dioptrice (work by Johannes Kepler)
 Catoptrics (study of and optical systems utilizing reflection)
 Catadioptrics (study of and optical systems utilizing reflection and refraction)
 Optical telescope
 List of telescope types
 Image-forming optical system

References

Telescopes
Optics